Vysokiy is an urban-type settlement in Khanty-Mansi Autonomous Okrug of Russia. It is subordinated to the city of Megion. Vysoky had a population of 7031 in 2014.

Geography
The village is located close to the Vatinsky Yogan riverbank.

Geographical position 
Distance city:

References

External links 
 terrus.ru —Database Russia

Urban-type settlements in Khanty-Mansi Autonomous Okrug
1982 establishments in the Soviet Union